See:
List of Swedish Short Course Swimming Championships champions (men)
List of Swedish Short Course Swimming Championships champions (women)

Swedish Short Course Swimming Championships
Short Course Swimming Championships champions